Coopsol may refer to:
Deportivo Coopsol, Peruvian football club based in Lima, founded in 1964
Sport Coopsol, Peruvian football club based in Lima, founded in 2000
Sport Coopsol Trujillo, Peruvian football club based in Trujillo, founded in 1995